Live PD: Roll Call is an American reality docuseries and spin-off of Live PD hosted by Dan Abrams, Tom Morris, Jr., and Sean "Sticks" Larkin. Until Live PD's cancellation, it served as a six-minute promotional tease of that night's episode of Live PD that aired one hour before the parent show.

Roll Call previewed that evening's Live PD episode, including police departments and officers followed, along with a brief recap of the previous episode. The series premiered on August 4, 2017 and aired concurrently with Live PDs schedule.

When Live PD temporarily ceased production in 2020 due to the COVID-19 pandemic, Roll Call was also dropped from A&E's schedule. While the parent show returned to air in a modified format three weeks later, Roll Call did not, and Live PD was eventually canceled on June 10, 2020, in the wake of the murder of George Floyd.

Series overview

References

2010s American reality television series
2014 American television series debuts
2020 American television series endings
American television spin-offs
Live PD
2020s American reality television series
Reality television spin-offs